Kallapalem is a village in the Kalidindi mandal of Krishna District in Andhra Pradesh, India. It comes under the Kaikaluru assembly constituency and Eluru Parliamentary constituency. The major occupation of the village is aqua-agriculture. In 2011 its population was 3,474.

References

Villages in Krishna district